Wu Kwang Soen Sa Nim (1950–present), born Richard Shrobe, is head Zen teacher at Chogye International Zen Center of New York, a practice center of the Kwan Um School of Zen. Before coming to Zen practice Richard studied Hinduism under Swami Satchidananda. He is a social worker who incorporates Gestalt therapy in his counseling. In 1975 Wu Kwang began his Zen practice and received Dharma transmission from Seung Sahn in 1993. He is also a jazz musician.

Bibliography
Open Mouth Already a Mistake, Cumberland, RI : Primary Point Press, 1997.  
Don't Know Mind: the Spirit of Korean Zen, Boston: Shambhala Publications, 2004.  
Elegant Failure: A Guide to Zen Koans, Berkeley, CA: Rodmell Press, 2010.

See also
Timeline of Zen Buddhism in the United States

References

Kwan Um School of Zen
Seon Buddhist monks
Zen Buddhism writers
American Zen Buddhists
1950 births
Living people
American Zen Buddhist spiritual teachers